Cross Roads is an unincorporated community in Laughery Township, Ripley County, in the U.S. state of Indiana.

History
The community was so named for the fact it originally contained a store at a crossroads. An old variant name of the community was called Spanglerville.

Geography

References

Unincorporated communities in Ripley County, Indiana
Unincorporated communities in Indiana